Zaluchye is the name of several rural localities in Russia:
Zaluchye, Novgorod Oblast, a selo in Zaluchskoye Settlement of Starorussky District of Novgorod Oblast
Zaluchye, Pskov Oblast, a village in Kunyinsky District of Pskov Oblast
Zaluchye (Sorozhskoye Rural Settlement), Ostashkovsky District, Tver Oblast, a village in Ostashkovsky District, Tver Oblast; municipally, a part of Sorozhskoye Rural Settlement of that district
Zaluchye (Zaluchyenskoye Rural Settlement), Ostashkovsky District, Tver Oblast, a village in Ostashkovsky District, Tver Oblast; municipally, a part of Zaluchyenskoye Rural Settlement of that district
Zaluchye, Udomelsky District, Tver Oblast, a village in Udomelsky District, Tver Oblast
Zaluchye, Vyshnevolotsky District, Tver Oblast, a village in Vyshnevolotsky District, Tver Oblast